Scott Howard is a World Champion Curler. 

Scott Howard may also refer to:

 Scott Howard, the main character in the 1985 film Teen Wolf
 Scott Howard, baritone singer of Legacy Five
 Scott Howard, editor of the Brock Citizen

See also
Howard Scott (disambiguation)